Born to Raise Hell may refer to:
 "Born to Raise Hell" (Motörhead song), 1993
 "Born to Raise Hell", a Church of Misery song from the 2009 album Houses of the Unholy
 "Born to Raise Hell", a Cheap Trick song from the 1983 film Rock & Rule
 Born to Raise Hell (film), a 2010 American action film